Aïda Diop (born 27 April 1970) is a Senegalese sprinter who specializes in 100 and 200 metres.

At the 2000 African Championships in Algiers she won silver medals in both 100 and 200 metres. She followed up at the 2002 African Championships in Radès with another silver medal in 200 m. She won bronze medals at the Jeux de la Francophonie in 1997 and 2001.

She competed at the World Championships in 1997, 1999 and 2001 as well as the 2000 Summer Olympics without reaching the finals. She has also competed in 4 x 400 metres relay at the World Championships and the Olympics.

Personal bests
100 metres - 11.26 s (2002)
200 metres - 22.64 s (2000)

External links

1970 births
Living people
Senegalese female sprinters
Athletes (track and field) at the 2000 Summer Olympics
Athletes (track and field) at the 2004 Summer Olympics
Olympic athletes of Senegal
African Games bronze medalists for Senegal
African Games medalists in athletics (track and field)
Athletes (track and field) at the 2003 All-Africa Games
Olympic female sprinters